Standard Eyes is an album by pianist Andy LaVerne recorded in 1990 and released on the Danish label, SteepleChase.

Reception 

Ken Dryden of AllMusic stated "LaVerne is simply superb throughout, with a rather abstract samba arrangement of "Autumn Leaves" and a very lyrical, understated take of "Just One of Those Things." Recommended".

Track listing 
 "Autumn Leaves" (Joseph Kosma, Jacques Prévert, Johnny Mercer) – 7:24   
 "When You Wish Upon a Star" (Leigh Harline, Ned Washington) – 7:01
 "There'll Never Be Another You" (Harry Warren, Mack Gordon) – 7:01   
 "Just One of Those Things" (Cole Porter) – 7:28
 "You're My Everything" (Warren, Mort Dixon, Joe Young) – 5:49
 "Laura" (David Raksin, Johnny Mercer) – 6:24
 "Stella by Starlight" (Victor Young, Washington) – 8:24
 "Someday My Prince Will Come" (Frank Churchill, Larry Morey) – 5:42
 "On Green Dolphin Street" (Bronisław Kaper, Washington) – 9:05

Personnel 
Andy LaVerne – piano
Steve LaSpina – bass
Anton Fig – drums

References 

 

Andy LaVerne albums
1991 albums
SteepleChase Records albums